Giuliano Razzoli (born 18 December 1984) is a World Cup alpine ski racer and Olympic gold medalist from Italy. He specializes in the slalom; he won the Slalom at the 2010 Winter Olympics in Vancouver.

Biography
Born at Castelnovo ne' Monti in Reggio Emilia, Razzoli took first place in slalom at the 2006 Italian Championships in Santa Caterina, Valfurva, which resulted in his automatic promotion to the Italian National A team. His World Cup debut was on his 22nd birthday, at a slalom in Alta Badia in December 2006.

Razzoli has nine World Cup podiums, all in slalom. His first World Cup victory came in January 2010 at Zagreb, Croatia, and his second was in Switzerland at Lenzerheide in March 2011.

2010 Winter Olympics
Razzoli became Olympic Champion at the 2010 Winter Olympics in Vancouver, winning the men's slalom. He clocked a combined total of one minute 39.32 seconds over the two runs, 0.16 seconds ahead of Croatia's Ivica Kostelic with Andre Myhrer of Sweden a further 0.28 seconds adrift.

25-year-old Razzoli, who was quickest in the first leg through fog and sleet at Whistler, became the first Italian man to win the Olympic Slalom title since Alberto Tomba, 22 years earlier at the 1988 Winter Olympics in Calgary. It was the only gold medal won by Italy at those Games.

World Cup results

Season standings

Race podiums
 2 wins – (2 SL)
 11 podiums – (11 SL)

World Championship results

Olympic results

References

External links
 
 
 Giuliano Razzoli at the Italian Winter Sports Federation (FISI) 
  

Living people
1984 births
Sportspeople from the Province of Reggio Emilia
Italian male alpine skiers
Olympic alpine skiers of Italy
Olympic gold medalists for Italy
Alpine skiers at the 2010 Winter Olympics
Alpine skiers at the 2014 Winter Olympics
Alpine skiers at the 2022 Winter Olympics
Olympic medalists in alpine skiing
Alpine skiers of Gruppo Sportivo Esercito
Medalists at the 2010 Winter Olympics